Giaura punctata is a moth in the family Nolidae. It was described by Thomas Pennington Lucas in 1890. It is found on the Bismarck Islands and on New Guinea and Australia (Northern Territory and Queensland).

The wingspan is about 20 mm.

References

Moths described in 1890
Chloephorinae